Raymond F. Almirall (1869–1939) was an American architect of the Beaux-Arts period, practicing in New York City.

Life and career
Almirall was born in New York in 1869. He studied architecture at Cornell University and at the Ecole des Beaux Arts in Paris. In 1896 he established an architectural firm in New York City with John W. Ingle, Ingle & Almirall.  The firm lasted until the end of 1900, when Almirall opened an independent office.  In the mid-teens, Almirall made Philip Alain Cusachs a member of his new firm, Almirall & Cusachs, which lasted into the 1920s.

He was a very creative architect for his time and his work incorporated the latest architectural techniques including structural steel, reinforced cement and reinforced concrete  

In 1909, Almirall designed what might have been his masterpiece, the Beaux-Arts classical style Brooklyn Central Library which was expected to be a major example of the City Beautiful architectural style in that city. But money was short, and construction did not begin for several years.  Soon after, money ran out and only the west wing wall was actually built. In 1937, the project was renewed and the New York firm of Githens & Keally was hired to redesign the building in the Modern Classical style. Almirall’s original scheme was abandoned in favor of the new one and the redesigned library was completed in 1941.

Almirall also designed several large churches for the Roman Catholic Diocese of Brooklyn. One of these, the Mortuary Chapel at Calvary Cemetery, Long Island City, New York, was described at the time of its construction as ‘’the Most Remarkable Mortuary Chapel in America’’.

He was one of the very few American architects of his day to design a Cathedral in a foreign country. His byzantine styled Holy Trinity Cathedral in Kingston, Jamaica, which contains a "broad, clearly articulated facade" and a large concrete dome.  In his book Hagia Sophia, 1850-1950: Holy Wisdom Modern Monument, author Robert S. Nelson compares the Cathedral to the Hagia Sophia.

Almirall also designed most of the buildings for the Seaview Hospital in Staten Island, New York,  which at the time of its construction was the largest tuberculosis hospital in the world where many of the successful treatments for this disease were to be created. Today this hospital is a ruin.

Architectural Works

Ingle & Almirall, 1896-1900
 1897 - Binghamton Municipal Building, 79 Collier St, Binghamton, New York
 1897 - St. Dominic R. C. Church, 93 Anstice St, Oyster Bay, New York
 1898 - Binghamton Savings Bank Building, 99 Collier St, Binghamton, New York
 1898 - St. Patrick R. C. Church, 39-38 29th St, Long Island City, New York
 1899 - R. C. Church of Our Lady of Sorrows, 104-11 37th Ave, Corona, Queens, New York
 1899 - St. Patrick R. C. Church, 235 Glen St, Glen Cove, New York
 1900 - R. C. Church of the Guardian Angel, 2978 Ocean Pkwy, Brooklyn, New York

Raymond F. Almirall, 1901-c.1915
 1903 - Pacific Library, 25 4th Ave, Brooklyn, New York
 1904 - Chi Psi Lodge, 200 Church St, Middletown, Connecticut
 Burned in 1912.
 1905 - Decauville Garage, 1743-1745 Broadway, New York, New York
 Demolished.
 1905 - Municipal Lodging House, 432-438 E 25th St, New York, New York
 An early version of the modern homeless shelter. Demolished.
 1905 - Seaview Hospital, 460 Brielle Ave, Staten Island, New York
 1905 - St. Michael's R. C. Church, 352 42nd St, Brooklyn, New York
 1906 - Fordham Hospital, Southern Blvd, Bronx, New York
 Demolished.
 1906 - Park Slope Library, 431 6th Ave, Brooklyn, New York
 1906 - Public Bath No. 7, 227 4th Ave, Brooklyn, New York
 1908 - Bushwick Library, 340 Bushwick Ave, Brooklyn, New York
 1908 - 49 Chambers (Emigrant Industrial Savings Bank Building), 49–51 Chambers St, New York, New York
 1908 - R. C. Cathedral of the Holy Trinity, North St, Kingston, Jamaica
 1910 - Chapin Home for the Aged, 16501 Chapin Pkwy, Jamaica, New York
 Demolished.
 1913 - Eastern Parkway Library, 1044 Eastern Pkwy, Brooklyn, New York
 1915 - R. C. Church of the Nativity, 20 Madison St, Brooklyn, New York

Almirall & Cusachs, from c.1916
 1916 - Notre Dame Home for the Aged, 660 183rd Ave, Bronx, New York
 1917 - Central Brooklyn Public Library, 10 Grand Army Plaza, Brooklyn, New York
 Partially built and then demolished.
 1920 - R. C. Church of the Nativity (Addition), 20 Madison St, Brooklyn, New York
 1926 - 386 Park Ave S, New York, New York

References

External links
 Raymond F. Almirall works. Held by the Department of Drawings & Archives, Avery Architectural & Fine Arts Library, Columbia University.

1869 births
1939 deaths
American ecclesiastical architects
Architects of Roman Catholic churches
Cornell University College of Architecture, Art, and Planning alumni
Architects of cathedrals
Architects from New York City
American alumni of the École des Beaux-Arts